Wójtówko  is a village in the administrative district of Gmina Jeziorany, within Olsztyn County, Warmian-Masurian Voivodeship, in northern Poland.

Notable residents
 Hermann Ganswindt (1856-1934), inventor

References

Villages in Olsztyn County